Blood of Zeus, formerly known as Gods & Heroes, is an American adult animated fantasy action streaming television series created and written by Charley and Vlas Parlapanides for Netflix. Produced by Powerhouse Animation Studios with the animation outsourced to South Korean studios Mua Film and Hanho Heung-Up, the series was released on October 27, 2020, on Netflix.

In early December 2020, Netflix renewed the show for a second season. According to the creators, they have five seasons outlined.

Premise
Set in mythical ancient Greece, the series revolves around Heron, the demigod son of Zeus, trying to save Olympus and Earth. Though Heron-himself is an original character created exclusively for the show, the existence of such demigods born of the union between a god and a human is implied to be common in the original myths. The show claims in its prologue to be one of the tales "lost to history" rather, than passed down with our current canon of Greek myths. The show features gods, giants, demons, automata, and mythical mounts from the original tales.

Voice cast
 Derek Phillips as Heron
 Jason O'Mara as Zeus/Elias
 Claudia Christian as Hera
 Elias Toufexis as Seraphim
 Mamie Gummer as Electra, Heron's mother
 Chris Diamantopoulos as Evios, Poseidon
 Jessica Henwick as Alexia
 Melina Kanakaredes as Ariana
 Matthew Mercer as Hermes, Alexia's Father
 Adetokumboh M'Cormack as Kofi
 Adam Croasdell as Apollo, Hephaestus
 Danny Jacobs as King Periander, King Acrisius
 Matt Lowe as Ares
 Jennifer Hale as Artemis, Clotho
 Fred Tatasciore as Hades
 David Shaughnessy as Chiron, Dionysus
 Vanessa Marshall as Ariana's Sister, Villager

Episodes

Reception
For the series, review aggregator Rotten Tomatoes collected 20 reviews and identified 100% of them to be positive, with an average rating of 8.14/10. The website's critics consensus reads, "Reforging Greek mythology as an epic battle royale with slick imagery and sterling voice acting, Blood of Zeus earns a spot on the Mount Olympus of action animation." Inverse.com called the series "Netflix's best American anime yet", while IGN gave it a 9/10 score. In a posting summarizing an interview on her podcast with the show's creators, Kate Sánchez argued that the series offers a "nuanced take on anger and how it relates to power" and noted how the series is part of the "continuing trend of adult animation." The show was nominated for an Annie Award for Best Music in 2021.

References

External links
 
 
 

2020 American television series debuts
Television series set in ancient Greece
2020s American adult animated television series
American action adventure television series
American adult animated action television series
American adult animated adventure television series
American adult animated fantasy television series
American adult animated web series
Animated television series by Netflix
Anime-influenced animation
Anime-influenced Western animation
Anime-influenced Western animated television series
Dark fantasy television series
English-language Netflix original programming
Television series based on classical mythology